The 2010 The National was the second Grand Slam event of the men's 2009-10 curling season. It was held January 6-10 at the Sleeman Centre in Guelph, Ontario.

The event featured just two international teams, gearing up for the upcoming 2010 Winter Olympics. John Shuster's Team USA failed to make the playoffs while Great Britain's David Murdoch lost in the quarter final. Also, Canada's Olympic representative, Kevin Martin failed to make the playoffs at a Slam for the first time since 2003. 

The final game featured Brad Gushue's rink from St. John's, Newfoundland against Randy Ferbey's Edmonton rink. Gushue, who lost last year's event beat Ferbey, and with it won his first Grand Slam title.

Gushue's team won $24,000 out of a total purse of $100,000.

Teams

Standings

Pool A

Scores:
Howard 5-2 Matchett
Stoughton 6-3 Middaugh
Shuster 8-3 Appelman
Middaugh 6-5 Matchett
Stoughton 7-4 Howard
Stoughton 4-3 Appelman
Shuster 5-4 Matchett
Middaugh 6-4 Howard
Stoughton 6-5 Shuster 
Appelman 8-3 Matchett
Howard 7-1 Shuster
Middaugh 8-3 Appelman 
Stoughton 8-4 Matchett 
Middaugh 4-3 Shuster
Howard 9-4 Appelman

Pool B

McEwen 8-3 Jacobs
Koe 8-6 Ursel 
Simmons 6-4 Martin
Ursel 10-5 Jacobs
Koe 6-4 McEwen 
Martin 5-2 Jacobs
McEwen 7-2 Simmons
Ursel 7-3 Martin
Ursel 10-6 Simmons
Koe 10-5 Jacobs
McEwen 8-5 Martin
Koe 7-3 Simmons
McEwen 8-4 Ursel 
Koe 7-4 Martin 
Simmons 7-5 Jacobs

Pool C
 

Burtnyk 6-5 Murdoch
Gushue 7-4 Gunnlaugson 
Ferbey 8-3 Geall
Burtnyk 7-2 Gunnlaugson
Murdoch 4-3 Gushue
Gunnlaugson 7-5 Geall
Burtnyk 9-3 Ferbey
Ferbey 7-2 Murdoch
Gushue 7-1 Geall
Murdoch 5-4 Geall
Ferbey 6-1 Gunnlaugson 
Gushue 7-3 Burtnyk
Geall 5-3 Burtnyk 
Murdoch 6-2 Gunnlaugson 
Ferbey 6-5 Gushue

Tie breakers
Murdoch 7-5 Burtnyk
Howard 9-5 Ursel

Playoffs

External link

National, The
The National (January)
Sport in Guelph
Curling in Ontario
The National (curling)
January 2010 sports events in Canada